Rimma Mikhailovna Zhukova (14 March 1925, Tyumen – 5 August 1999, Moscow) was a Soviet speed skater.

Rimma Zhukova competed for the Soviet Union and after having become Soviet Allround Champion three times and having won the prestigious Kirov prize four times, she became World Allround Champion in 1955. Zhukova was one of the Soviet women who dominated skating for almost 20 years starting in 1948. Since all three medals at every one of the twelve World Championships between 1953 and 1964 were won by Soviet women, the strongest competition Zhukova experienced came from other Soviet skaters.


Medals
An overview of medals won by Zhukova at important championships she participated in, listing the years in which she won each:

World records
Over the course of her career, Zhukova skated eight world records:

Personal records
To put these personal records in perspective, the WR column lists the official world records on the dates that Zhukova skated her personal records.

Note that Zhukova's personal record on the 1000 m was not a world record because Tamara Rylova skated 1:33.4 at the same tournament.

Zukova has an Adelskalender score of 193.050 points.

References
Rimma Zhukova at SkateResults.com
Rimma Zhukova. Deutsche Eisschnelllauf Gemeinschaft e.V. (German Skating Association).
Evert Stenlund's Adelskalender pages
Results of Soviet Championships at SpeedSkating.ru
Historical World Records. International Skating Union.

1925 births
1999 deaths
People from Tyumen
Dynamo sports society athletes
Honoured Masters of Sport of the USSR
Recipients of the Order of the Red Banner of Labour
Russian female speed skaters
Soviet female speed skaters
World Allround Speed Skating Championships medalists
World record setters in speed skating
Burials in Troyekurovskoye Cemetery
Sportspeople from Tyumen Oblast